The Audi Q5 is a series of compact luxury crossover SUVs produced by the German luxury car manufacturer Audi from 2008. The original first-generation (Typ 8R) model was the third member of the B8 family to be released after the Audi A5 and fourth-generation A4, all being based on the Audi MLB platform. The second generation Q5 (Typ 80A) debuted in 2016 and shares the Audi MLB Evo platform with the corresponding B9 versions of the A4 and A5.

First generation (Typ 8R; 2008–2017)

Audi Cross Cabriolet quattro concept (2007)
The vehicle was unveiled at the 2007 Los Angeles Auto Show.

Initial version

Q5 (2008)
The vehicle was unveiled at the 2008 Beijing Auto Show, and later at the 2008 Los Angeles Auto Show.

Early models include the 2.0 TFSI quattro (211PS), 2.0 TDI quattro (170PS), 3.0 TDI quattro.

Initial vehicle models for US, Canada & Brazil include the 3.2 FSI.

The Q5 commenced shipments in October 2008 for Europe, and in the first quarter of 2009 for North America.

The US model went on sale in March 2009 as a 2009 model year vehicle. Early models include 3.2 FSI quattro and the 2.0 TFSI quattro (211PS) was added in 2011 model year.

Indian models went on sale in June 2009, and were initially built by Audi's Ingolstadt facility, but are now being built at its Aurangabad, Maharashtra, India plant. Launch models include 3.0 TDI, 2.0 TFSI (211 PS).

Middle East models went on sale in 2009 Q2. Launch models include 2.0 TFSI (211 PS), 3.2 FSI.

Japanese models include 2.0 TFSI quattro (211 PS), 3.2 FSI quattro.

Audi Q5 custom concept (2009)
It is a concept vehicle that includes an enhanced engine, 7-speed S tronic transmission, Quattro all wheel drive. Other features include ceramic brakes, active sound exhaust system, 90 millimetre wider track, 60 millimetre lower ride height, 21-inch Daytona Gray colour wheels of 7 twin-spoke design, modified air intake, cooling water strut brace in engine compartment, stainless steel-plated pedals, S line sport seats, panorama roof system, "Wörthersee 09" adhesive film, textile floor mats with "Wörthersee 09" print application, Audi drive select vehicle dynamics system, parking aid with rearview camera, voice control, Audi lane assist (lane departure warning), headlight range control with cornering lights.

The vehicle was unveiled at the Wörthersee Tour 2009.

Audi Q5 FCEV (2009)
The Audi Q5 FCEV (2009) is a fuel cell based concept car that was demonstrated on 19 October 2009 at CEP Berlin. It sports an 85 kW PEMFC, a 22 kW lithium-ion battery and a 230 Nm asynchronous motor.

Audi Q5 hybrid
Audi has originally reported that it would offer the Q5 hybrid as launch model, but it was later reported that Audi suspended the plan because of unsatisfactory crash test results for the nickel metal hydride batteries. In 2009, Audi announced it would resume the Q5 hybrid development. It included a 266V, 1.3kWh, battery pack.

The production version would be on sale in 2012 for the Japanese market. The release in the U.S. market was scheduled for late 2011.

Engines

180 PS 2.0 TFSI and 143 PS 2.0 TDI engines were introduced in Europe beginning in 2009.

Transmissions

German models include standard 7-speed S tronic transmission for all V6 models. 8-speed Tiptronic is an option for Q5 2.0 TFSI quattro (211 PS).

US and Canadian Q5 3.2 FSI models include 6-speed Tiptronic as standard transmission. US and Canadian Q5 2.0 TFSI models include 8-speed Tiptronic as standard transmission.

Japanese models include standard 7-speed S tronic transmission for all models.

Equipment

Harman/Becker Automotive Systems produced Audi's new updated Multi Media Interface (MMI) technology for Q5. The new system includes navigation, communication, and wide-screen entertainment. A three-dimensional orientation view with true-to-scale terrain and photo realistic depictions of key landmarks will also be generated. Included features in this new system are USB storage media (iPod or MP3), satellite radio, and an integral four-band GSM mobile/cell phone (SIM card ready) with Bluetooth connectivity.

S line package includes 20-inch S line wheels, headlight washers, sport steering wheels with shift paddles, brushed aluminium inlays, S line aluminium door sills, and a black headliner. The Offroad exterior package includes front and rear underbody protection panels, along with flared fender and door sill protection.

Carrying and towing capabilities
If a roof rack is present, the ESP engages earlier in the handling limit. Without a roof load, the driver is free to tap the full dynamic potential of the Audi Q5.

The Audi Q5 is capable of towing up to 2.0 tonnes; the standard hill descent control system makes it safe to navigate down steep inclines by regulating the preselected speed when driving at under . The Q5 is also fitted with an advanced Trailer Stability Program designed to combat any unwanted snaking when towing a large trailer or caravan.

Production
The new vehicle was expected to be built in Audi's home town of Ingolstadt. An investment of €300 million in production tooling and expansion was expected.

In September 2016, Audi has opened a factory with a capacity of 150.000 Q5 in San José Chiapa (Mexico).

2012 facelift

Main changes include a redesigned set of front and rear light configuration, and a new set of engines that increase both output and efficiency. Most interior user controls have narrow chrome trim. Ergonomics changes include 4-button MMI navigation plus system, additional skip function for volume dial. Large fabric-upholstered surfaces are standard on the door trim panels; inlay options include three wood veneers and one aluminium version.

The vehicles went on sale in summer 2012. Early models include 2.0 TFSI hybrid quattro, 2.0 TFSI quattro (225PS), 3.0 TFSI quattro (272PS), 2.0 TDI (143PS), 2.0 TDI quattro (177PS), 3.0 TDI quattro (245PS).

In Germany, 2.0 TFSI quattro (180PS), 2.0 TDI (150PS), 2.0 TDI quattro (150PS) were added in 2013, with 2.0 TDI (150PS) replacing 2.0 TDI (143PS).

Pre-facelift styling

Post-facelift styling

SQ5 TDI (2013–)

The SQ5 performance crossover SUV is the first Audi S model vehicle to feature a diesel engine. It also features Audi's signature quattro permanent all-wheel drive system with torque vectoring transfer. Other features of the SQ5 are black front brake callipers with Audi 'S' badges, an optional Audi drive select system, a platinum-grey single-frame grille with galvanized double bars, two SQ5 unique body colours (Estoril Blue or Panther Black), optional lunar silver headlining, Pearl Nappa leather/Alcantara power-adjustable sport seats with optional leather upholstery in a choice of four colours, brushed aluminium inlays with optional Carbon Atlas, Piano finish or Aluminium/Beaufort wood trim panels.
The SQ5 TDI accelerates from 0– in 5.1 secs, and is electronically limited to 155 mph. This is comparable to rival range-topping performance SUVs with diesel engines, such as the Porsche Cayenne S Diesel (0–: 5.7 s) and BMW X5 M50d (0–: 5.4 s), and also to high-performance petrol-powered SUVs, such as the Mercedes-Benz ML63 AMG (0–: 4.8 s), Porsche Cayenne Turbo S (0–: 4.1 s). These listed rivals are all larger and heavier, falling into the mid-size SUV class, and, as such, command significantly higher asking prices. A more realistic comparison may be made with the BMW X3 xDrive35d, which delivers slightly better economy (46.3 mpg to the SQ5's 41.5), though slightly lower performance (0–: 5.8 s,).

The SQ5 went on sale in the first quarter of 2013.

SQ5 TDI Audi exclusive concept (2013–)
It is a limited (50 units) version of the Audi SQ5 TDI with Aral Blue crystal effect body colour, black Fine Nappa leather upholstery with contrasting stitching in snow white, black sport seats covered in Fine Nappa leather, woven leather in the centre section of the seats, snow white Alcantara headlining, sunroof blind, inlays and applications shimmer.

The vehicle was unveiled in the 2012 Paris Motor Show, and went on sale in the first quarter of 2013.

SQ5 3.0 TFSI quattro (2013–)

The vehicle was unveiled in 2013 Detroit Auto Show.

The vehicle was designed for United States, Canada, Russia, China, Japan, Singapore, South Korea, South Africa, Mexico, Brazil, Argentina, Chile and Ukraine markets.

US model was set to arrive at U.S. dealerships in the third quarter of 2013 as 2014 model year vehicle.

Engines

All engines include start-stop system. 3.0 TFSI quattro (272PS) replaced 3.2 FSI quattro.

Transmissions

Safety
NHTSA tested a 2016 Q5.
Euro NCAP tested a 2009 Audi Q5, 5-door SUV with front airbags, side airbags, seatbelt pretensioners and load limiters as standard and scored it accordingly:

The Insurance Institute for Highway Safety also crash-tested the Q5, and presented the following results (ratings from 'poor' to 'good'):

Emissions concerns
On the 19th of August 2020 tagesschau.de reported that "turning the steering wheel changes exhaust emissions" significantly under test conditions.

The First Generation 3.2L FSI engine is extremely prone to carbon buildup in the secondary air injection system, resulting in an extremely costly and necessary repair—which often rears its head following the warranty period.

Second generation (Typ 80A; 2017–present)

The second generation Q5 (Typ FY) was revealed at the 2016 Paris Motor Show.

Long wheelbase version (Q5L), (2018-)
A long wheelbase version was unveiled at the Beijing Auto Show, with  added to the car, resulting in 23 percent more legroom.

Markets

Asia
The second generation of the Q5 will be the first generation of the Q5 to be sold in Bangladesh.

The Q5 was launched in Thailand in August 2017, where a sole S line powered by a 2.0 TFSI engine (45 TFSI) and 2.0 TDI engine (40 TDI) with an Quattro all wheel drive system is available.

The Q5 was launched in Malaysia in March 2019, where a sole Sport trim line powered by a 2.0 TFSI engine with an Quattro all wheel drive system is available.

Fast forward to August 2021, the facelifted Q5 was launched in Malaysia. with the sportier S Line trim. It gets a 2.0 TFSI engine with mild-hybrid tech, Quattro AWD and the S Tronic dual-clutch transmission. Not long after, the Q5 Sportback also made its local debut here in Malaysia.

North America
The second generation Q5 was launched in North America in 2018. Production shifted from Germany to the new Audi México, S.A. de C.V. factory in San José Chiapa, Puebla, México. The Q5 was launched with a 2.0 TFSI petrol engine. Audi's Quattro all-wheel drive system is standard, however it uses ‘Quattro with Ultra Technology’. According to Audi, Ultra technology improves efficiency by decoupling the driveshaft to the rear wheels when all-wheel drive is not needed. Essentially the vehicle becomes front wheel drive when cruising, or in other driving situations where the vehicle's computers determine all-wheel traction is not needed. Audi claims the system is able to re-engage power to the rear wheels within milliseconds of the system detecting or predicting slip or the driver accelerating aggressively.

Unlike in the previous 8R generation Q5, US vehicles are only offered with the 2.0T TFSI I-4 engine. The 2.0T ‘45 TFSI’ model offers acceleration similar to the previous generation's 3.0 TFSI Supercharged V6 (face-lifted Q5 8R, 2013–2017) while using less fuel and reduced emissions. No TDI version will be offered in North America due to the fallout from the diesel emissions scandal. Bucking an industry-wide trend of moving away from dual clutch transmissions for the latest generation of conventional torque converter automatics, Audi actually replaced the previous generation's ZF 8HP 8-speed automatic transmission for their own 7-speed S-Tronic dual clutch gearbox.

The SQ5 is offered as a performance variant of the Q5. In North American spec, it uses a 3.0L DOHC direct-injected Miller Cycle-capable 90° V6 with a single mono-scroll turbocharger. This engine, dubbed EA839, is a substantially reworked version of the previous-generation supercharged V6 (EA837) that was used in the first generation Q5 3.0T and SQ5. Unlike the lesser powered Q5 ‘45 TFSI’ 2.0T, Audi retained ZF's 8HP transmission for the SQ5. Unlike the Q5, the SQ5 utilizes the full-time rear-biased quattro VI AWD system.

For the 2019 model year, heated front seats, rear electric child locks, 7-inch infotainment screen, and roof crossbars became standard equipment. For the Premium Plus trim, rear USB charge ports and wireless charging became standard while for Prestige trims, park assist was made standard. The Convenience Package was expanded to include the Audi side assist and Audi pre sense rear safety systems. In addition, Audi introduced a "black optic" package for the Q5, featuring black exterior trim and unique wheels. The SQ5 also became available in the Premium trim.

In 2020, Audi introduced the Q5 TFSI e plug-in hybrid variant. It featured a 14.1 kWh lithium-ion battery, giving an EPA estimated  of range. A heat pump was implemented into the climate control system, providing for greater heating efficiency. The plug-in variant also received the Turbo Blue and Daytona Gray colors, available only on the plug-in variant and SQ5 models.

2021 facelift

The 2021 Model Year includes the Generation 3 infotainment technologies. This includes a digital marketplace in the myAudi app to add Audi Connect plans and SiriusXM with 360L. Exterior facelift revisions include updates to the grille, bumper side air intakes, side sill, and rear trim. In addition, District Green and Ultra Blue were new paint colors available on the PHEV and SQ5 variants.

The 2021 Q5 was announced at the end of June 2020 and with expected first deliveries at the end of 2020. In January 2021, Audi expanded the Q5 lineup by introducing a Sportback variant of the Q5 and SQ5.

The Q5 was launched in India on 23 November 2021 offering two variants - Premium Plus and Technology.

Safety 
The 2022 Q5 was awarded the "Top Safety Pick+" by the Insurance Institute for Highway Safety.

Production

See also 
List of fuel cell vehicles

References

Notes

Bibliography

 

Q5
Cars introduced in 2008
2010s cars
2020s cars
Compact sport utility vehicles
Luxury crossover sport utility vehicles
Front-wheel-drive vehicles
All-wheel-drive vehicles
Euro NCAP large off-road
Euro NCAP small off-road
Hybrid electric vehicles
Plug-in hybrid vehicles